The Tampa Bay Rays are a professional baseball team based in St. Petersburg, Florida. The Rays are a member of the Eastern Division of Major League Baseball's (MLB) American League (AL). Since their inaugural season in 1998, the Rays have played their home games at Tropicana Field. The team was originally known as the "Tampa Bay Devil Rays", which was inspired by a common nickname of the manta ray, but after the 2007 season, they shortened their official name to the "Tampa Bay Rays."

Tampa Bay made their Major League debut in 1998, where they were an expansion team. For their first ten seasons, Tampa Bay struggled, never had a winning record, and always finished fifth in the American League Eastern Division, except for a fourth-place finish in the 2004 season. Since 2008 however, the Rays have advanced to the postseason eight times and have played in the World Series twice, in 2008 and 2020. In 2021 the Rays achieved a 100-win regular season for the first time.

Table Key

Regular season results

Record by decade 
The following table describes the Rays' MLB win–loss record by decade.

These statistics are from Baseball-Reference.com's Tampa Bay Rays History & Encyclopedia, and are current through the  regular season.

Post-season record by year
The Rays have made the postseason seven times in their history, with their first being in 2008 and the most recent being in 2021.

See also
 Tampa Bay Rays team records
 List of Tampa Bay Rays Opening Day starting pitchers
 Tampa Bay Rays managers and ownership

References

External links
 Rays Year-By-Year Results at MLB.com
 Rays Postseason Results at MLB.com

 
Major League Baseball teams seasons
Seasons